The Mason and Hamlin Prize was a national piano competition, sponsored by Mason and Hamlin. The grand prize was a Mason and Hamlin grand piano. The competition is held annually in Jordan Hall, New England Conservatory, Boston, Massachusetts.

Winners 
 1910 – Julius Chaloff
 1919 – Naomi Bevard
 1920 – Jesús María Sanromá
 1925 – William Beller
 1935 – Peter Louis Walters
 1975 – Joseph Evans (professor and chairman of the Music Department, Michigan State University)
 2007 – Nathan James Knutson

References 

Piano competitions in the United States